Jakob Martinus Remseth (5 October 1897 – 4 May 1969) was a Norwegian politician for the Labour Party.

He was born in Dønnes.

He was elected to the Norwegian Parliament from Rogaland in 1945, and was re-elected on four occasions. He had previously been a deputy representative in the period 1937–1945.

Remseth was mayor of Sauda municipality during the terms 1937–1941, 1945–1947 and 1947–1951.

References

1897 births
1969 deaths
Labour Party (Norway) politicians
Members of the Storting
20th-century Norwegian politicians